Sappho (Sapphō ; Aeolic Greek  Psápphō; c. 630 – c. 570 BC) was an Archaic Greek poet from Eresos or Mytilene on the island of Lesbos. Sappho is known for her lyric poetry, written to be sung while accompanied by music. In ancient times, Sappho was widely regarded as one of the greatest lyric poets and was given names such as the "Tenth Muse" and "The Poetess". Most of Sappho's poetry is now lost, and what is extant has mostly survived in fragmentary form; only the "Ode to Aphrodite" is certainly complete. As well as lyric poetry, ancient commentators claimed that Sappho wrote elegiac and iambic poetry. Three epigrams attributed to Sappho are extant, but these are actually Hellenistic imitations of Sappho's style.

Little is known of Sappho's life. She was from a wealthy family from Lesbos, though her parents' names are uncertain. Ancient sources say that she had three brothers; Charaxos (Χάραξος), Larichos (Λάριχος) and Eurygios (Εὐρύγιος). Two of them, Charaxos and Larichos, are also mentioned in the Brothers Poem discovered in 2014. She was exiled to Sicily around 600 BC, and may have continued to work until around 570 BC. According to legend, she killed herself by leaping from the Leucadian cliffs due to her love for the ferryman Phaon.

Sappho was a prolific poet, probably composing around 10,000 lines. Her poetry was well-known and greatly admired through much of antiquity, and she was among the canon of Nine Lyric Poets most highly esteemed by scholars of Hellenistic Alexandria. Sappho's poetry is still considered extraordinary and her works continue to influence other writers. Beyond her poetry, she is well known as a symbol of love and desire between women, with the English words sapphic and lesbian deriving from her name and that of her home island respectively.

Ancient sources
Modern knowledge of Sappho comes both from what can be inferred from her own poetry, and from mentions of her in other ancient texts.  Sappho's own poetry is the only contemporary source for her life.  The earliest surviving biography of Sappho dates to the late second or early third century AD, approximately eight centuries after Sappho's own life; the next is the Suda, a Byzantine-era encyclopedia.  Other sources that mention details of Sappho's life were written much closer to her own era, beginning in the fifth century BC.  The information about Sappho's life recorded in ancient sources was derived from statements in her own poetry that ancient authors assumed were biographical, along with local traditions.  Some of the ancient traditions about Sappho, such as those about her sexuality and appearance, may derive from comedy.

Until the 19th century, ancient sources about archaic poets' lives were largely accepted uncritically. In the 19th century, classicists began to be more sceptical of these traditions, and instead tried to derive biographical information from their surviving poetry.  In the latter half of the 20th century, scholars became increasingly sceptical of Greek lyric poetry as a source of autobiographical information.  Some scholars, such as Mary Lefkowitz, argued that almost nothing can be known about the lives of early Greek poets such as Sappho; most scholars believe that ancient testimonies about poets' lives contain some truth but must be treated with caution.

Life
Little is known about Sappho's life for certain. She was from the island of Lesbos and lived at the end of the seventh and beginning of the sixth centuries BC.  This is the date given by most ancient sources, who considered her a contemporary of Alcaeus and Pittacus. She therefore may have been born in the third quarter of the seventh century – Franco Ferrari infers a date of around 650 or 640 BC; David Campbell suggests around or before 630 BC.  Gregory Hutchinson suggests she was active until around 570 BC.

Tradition names her mother as Cleïs. This may derive from a now-lost poem or record, though ancient scholars may simply have guessed this name, assuming that Sappho's daughter Cleïs was named after her. Sappho's father's name is less certain. Ten names are known for Sappho's father from ancient sources; this proliferation of possible names suggests that he was not explicitly named in any of Sappho's poetry. The earliest and most commonly attested name for Sappho's father is Scamandronymus. In Ovid's Heroides, Sappho's father died when she was seven. He is not mentioned in any of her surviving works, but Campbell suggests that this detail may have been based on a now-lost poem. Sappho's own name is found in numerous variant spellings; the form that appears in her own extant poetry is Psappho (Ψάπφω).

Sappho was said to have three brothers: Erigyius, Larichus, and Charaxus. According to Athenaeus, she often praised Larichus for pouring wine in the town hall of Mytilene, an office held by boys of the best families. This indication that Sappho was born into an aristocratic family is consistent with the sometimes rarefied environments that her verses record. One ancient tradition tells of a relation between Charaxus and the Egyptian courtesan Rhodopis. Herodotus, the oldest source of the story, reports that Charaxus ransomed Rhodopis for a large sum and that Sappho wrote a poem rebuking him for this. The names of two of the brothers, Charaxus and Larichus, are mentioned in the Brothers Poem, discovered in 2014; the final brother, Erigyius, is mentioned in three ancient sources but nowhere in the extant works of Sappho.

She may have had a daughter named Cleïs, who is referred to in two fragments. Not all scholars accept that Cleïs was Sappho's daughter. Fragment 132 describes Cleïs as "παῖς" (pais), which, as well as meaning "child", can also refer to the "youthful beloved in a male homosexual liaison". It has been suggested that Cleïs was one of Sappho's younger lovers, rather than her daughter, though Judith Hallett argues that the language used in fragment 132 suggests that Sappho was referring to Cleïs as her daughter.

According to the Suda, Sappho was married to Kerkylas of Andros. This name appears to have been invented by a comic poet: the name "Kerkylas" appears to be a diminutive of the word , a possible meaning of which is "penis", and is not otherwise attested as a name, while "Andros", as well as being the name of a Greek island, is a form of the Greek word , which means "man". Thus, the name is likely a joke, that Sappho was married to "Dick of Man" (or, as some scholars have facetiously translated it, "he's Dick-Allcock from the Isle of MAN").

One tradition said that Sappho was exiled from Lesbos around 600 BC. The Parian Chronicle records Sappho going into exile in Sicily some time between 604 and 595, perhaps coinciding with Pittacus taking power in 597. This may have been as a result of her family's involvement with the conflicts between political elites on Lesbos in this period, the same reason for the exile of Sappho's contemporary Alcaeus from Mytilene around the same time.

A tradition going back at least to Menander (Fr. 258 K) suggested that Sappho killed herself by jumping off the Leucadian cliffs for love of Phaon, a ferryman. This is regarded as ahistorical by modern scholars, perhaps invented by the comic poets or originating from a misreading of a first-person reference in a non-biographical poem. The legend may have resulted in part from a desire to assert Sappho as heterosexual.

Works

Sappho probably wrote around 10,000 lines of poetry; today, only about 650 survive. She is best known for her lyric poetry, written to be accompanied by music. The Suda also attributes to Sappho epigrams, elegiacs, and iambics; three of these epigrams are extant, but are in fact later Hellenistic poems inspired by Sappho.  The iambic and elegiac poems attributed to her in the Suda may also be later imitations. Ancient authors claim that Sappho primarily wrote love poetry, and the indirect transmission of Sappho's work supports this notion. However, the papyrus tradition suggests that this may not have been the case: a series of papyri published in 2014 contains fragments of ten consecutive poems from Book I of the Alexandrian edition of Sappho, of which only two are certainly love poems, while at least three and possibly four are primarily concerned with family.

Ancient editions
Sappho's poetry was probably first written down on Lesbos, either in her lifetime or shortly afterwards, initially probably in the form of a score for performers of her work. In the fifth century BC, Athenian book publishers probably began to produce copies of Lesbian lyric poetry, some including explanatory material and glosses as well as the poems themselves. Some time in the second or third century, Alexandrian scholars produced a critical edition of Sappho's poetry. There may have been more than one Alexandrian edition – John J. Winkler argues for two, one edited by Aristophanes of Byzantium and another by his pupil Aristarchus of Samothrace. This is not certain – ancient sources tell us that Aristarchus' edition of Alcaeus replaced the edition by Aristophanes, but are silent on whether Sappho's work also went through multiple editions.

The Alexandrian edition of Sappho's poetry was based on the existing Athenian collections, and was divided into at least eight books, though the exact number is uncertain. Many modern scholars have followed Denys Page, who conjectured a ninth book in the standard edition; Yatromanolakis doubts this, noting that though ancient sources refer to an eighth book of Sappho's poetry, none mention a ninth. The Alexandrian edition of Sappho probably grouped her poems by their metre: ancient sources tell us that each of the first three books contained poems in a single specific metre. Ancient editions of Sappho, possibly starting with the Alexandrian edition, seem to have ordered the poems in at least the first book of Sappho's poetry – which contained works composed in Sapphic stanzas – alphabetically.

Even after the publication of the standard Alexandrian edition, Sappho's poetry continued to circulate in other poetry collections. For instance, the Cologne Papyrus on which the Tithonus poem is preserved was part of a Hellenistic anthology of poetry, which contained poetry arranged by theme, rather than by metre and incipit, as it was in the Alexandrian edition.

Surviving poetry

The earliest surviving manuscripts of Sappho, including the potsherd on which fragment 2 is preserved, date to the third century BC, and thus might predate the Alexandrian edition. The latest surviving copies of Sappho's poems transmitted directly from ancient times are written on parchment codex pages from the sixth and seventh centuries AD, and were surely reproduced from ancient papyri now lost. Manuscript copies of Sappho's works may have survived a few centuries longer, but around the ninth century her poetry appears to have disappeared, and by the 12th century, John Tzetzes could write that "the passage of time has destroyed Sappho and her works".

According to legend, Sappho's poetry was lost because the church disapproved of her morals. These legends appear to have originated in the Renaissance – around 1550, Jerome Cardan wrote that Gregory Nazianzen had Sappho's work publicly destroyed, and at the end of the 16th century Joseph Justus Scaliger claimed that Sappho's works were burned in Rome and Constantinople in 1073 on the orders of Pope Gregory VII.

In reality, Sappho's work was probably lost as the demand for it was insufficiently great for it to be copied onto parchment when codices superseded papyrus scrolls as the predominant form of book. A contributing factor to the loss of Sappho's poems may have been her Aeolic dialect, considered provincial in a period where the Attic dialect was seen as the true classical Greek, and had become the standard for literary compositions. Consequently, many readers found Sappho's dialect difficult to understand: in the second century AD, the Roman author Apuleius specifically remarks on its "strangeness", and several commentaries on the subject demonstrate the difficulties that readers had with it. This was part of a more general decline in interest in the archaic poets; indeed, the surviving papyri suggest that Sappho's poetry survived longer than that of her contemporaries such as Alcaeus.

Only approximately 650 lines of Sappho's poetry still survive, of which just one poem – the "Ode to Aphrodite" – is complete, and more than half of the original lines survive in around ten more fragments. Many of the surviving fragments of Sappho contain only a single word – for example, fragment 169A is simply a word meaning "wedding gifts", and survives as part of a dictionary of rare words. The two major sources of surviving fragments of Sappho are quotations in other ancient works, from a whole poem to as little as a single word, and fragments of papyrus, many of which were rediscovered at Oxyrhynchus in Egypt. Other fragments survive on other materials, including parchment and potsherds. The oldest surviving fragment of Sappho currently known is the Cologne papyrus that contains the Tithonus poem, dating to the third century BC.

Until the last quarter of the 19th century, only the ancient quotations of Sappho survived. In 1879, the first new discovery of a fragment of Sappho was made at Fayum. By the end of the 19th century, Grenfell and Hunt had begun to excavate an ancient rubbish dump at Oxyrhynchus, leading to the discoveries of many previously unknown fragments of Sappho. Fragments of Sappho continue to be rediscovered. Most recently, major discoveries in 2004 (the "Tithonus poem" and a new, previously unknown fragment) and 2014 (fragments of nine poems: five already known but with new readings, four, including the "Brothers Poem", not previously known) have been reported in the media around the world.

Style

Sappho worked within a well-developed tradition of Lesbian poetry, which had evolved its own poetic diction, metres, and conventions. Prior to Sappho and her contemporary Alcaeus, Lesbos was associated with poetry and music through the mythical Orpheus and Arion, and the seventh-century BC poet Terpander.  The Lesbian metrical tradition in which Sappho composed her poetry was distinct from that of the rest of Greece as its lines always contained a fixed number of syllables – in contrast to other traditions that allowed for the substitution of two short syllables for one long or vice versa.

Sappho was one of the first Greek poets to adopt the "lyric 'I'" – to write poetry adopting the viewpoint of a specific person, in contrast to the earlier epic poets Homer and Hesiod, who present themselves more as "conduits of divine inspiration". Her poetry explores individual identity and personal emotions – desire, jealousy, and love; it also adopts and reinterprets the existing imagery of epic poetry in exploring these themes. It seems to have been composed for a variety of occasions both public and private, and probably encompassed both solo and choral works.  Along with the love poetry for which she is best known, her surviving works include poetry focused on the family, epic-influenced narrative, wedding songs, cult hymns, and invective.

Sappho's poetry is known for its clear language and simple thoughts, sharply-drawn images, and use of direct quotation that brings a sense of immediacy. Unexpected word-play is a characteristic feature of her style. An example is from fragment 96: "now she stands out among Lydian women as after sunset the rose-fingered moon exceeds all stars", a variation of the Homeric epithet "rosy-fingered Dawn". Sappho's poetry often uses hyperbole, according to ancient critics "because of its charm". An example is found in fragment 111, where Sappho writes that "The groom approaches like Ares [...] Much bigger than a big man".

Leslie Kurke groups Sappho with those archaic Greek poets from what has been called the "élite" ideological tradition, which valued luxury (habrosyne) and high birth. These elite poets tended to identify themselves with the worlds of Greek myths, gods, and heroes, as well as the wealthy East, especially Lydia. Thus in fragment 2 Sappho has Aphrodite "pour into golden cups nectar lavishly mingled with joys", while in the Tithonus poem she explicitly states that "I love the finer things [habrosyne]". According to Page DuBois, the language, as well as the content, of Sappho's poetry evokes an aristocratic sphere. She contrasts Sappho's "flowery,[...] adorned" style with the "austere, decorous, restrained" style embodied in the works of later classical authors such as Sophocles, Demosthenes, and Pindar.

Music

Sappho's poetry was written to be sung but its musical content is largely uncertain. 
As it is unlikely that any system of musical notation existed in Ancient Greece before the fifth century, the original music that would have accompanied Sappho's songs probably did not survive until the classical period, and no ancient musical scores to accompany Sappho's poetry survive. Sappho was said to have written in the mixolydian mode, which was considered sorrowful; it was commonly used in Greek tragedy, and Aristoxenus believed that the tragedians learned it from Sappho.  Aristoxenus attributed Sappho the invention of this mode, but this remains a dubious claim. The classicist Stefan Hagel speculated that perhaps instead Sappho first popularized the association between mixolydian and mournfulness. While there are no attestations that she used other modes, she presumably varied them depending on the poem's character. When originally sung, each syllable of her text likely corresponded to one note as the use of lengthy melismas developed in the later classical period.

Sappho chiefly wrote for two formats: solo singers and choirs. With Alcaeus, she pioneered a new style of sung monody (single-line melody) that departed from the multi-part choral style that largely defined earlier Greek music. This style afforded her more opportunities to individualize the content of her poems; the historian Plutarch noted that she "speaks words mingled truly with fire, and through her songs, she draws up the heat of her heart". Some scholars theorize that the Tithonus Poem was among her works meant for a solo singer. Only fragments of Sappho's choral works are extant, and of these, slightly more of her epithalamia wedding songs survive. The later compositions were probably meant for antiphonal performance between either a male and female choir or a soloist and choir.

In Sappho's time, sung poetry was accompanied by musical instruments, which usually doubled the voice in unison or played homophonically an octave higher or lower. Her poems mention numerous instruments, including the pēktis, a harp of Lydian origin, and lyre. Sappho is most closely associated with the barbitos, a lyre-like string instrument that was deep in pitch.  Euphorion of Chalcis reports that she referred to it in her poetry, and a well-known fifth-century vase by either the Dokimasia Painter or Brygos Painter includes Sappho and Alcaeus with barbitoi. Sappho mentions the aulos, a wind instrument with two pipes, in fragment 44 as accompanying the song of the Trojan women at Hector and Andromache's wedding, but not as accompanying her own poetry.  Later Greek commentators wrongly believed that she had invented the plectrum.

Sexuality

The common term lesbian is an allusion to Sappho, originating from the name of the island of Lesbos, where she was born. However, she has not always been considered so. In classical Athenian comedy (from the Old Comedy of the fifth century to Menander in the late fourth and early third centuries BC), Sappho was caricatured as a promiscuous heterosexual woman, and it is not until the Hellenistic period that the first sources which explicitly discuss Sappho's homoeroticism are preserved. The earliest of these is a fragmentary biography written on papyrus in the late third or early second century BC, which states that Sappho was "accused by some of being irregular in her ways and a woman-lover". Denys Page comments that the phrase "by some" implies that even the full corpus of Sappho's poetry did not provide conclusive evidence of whether she described herself as having sex with women. These ancient authors do not appear to have believed that Sappho did, in fact, have sexual relationships with other women, and as late as the 10th century the Suda records that Sappho was "slanderously accused" of having sexual relationships with her "female pupils".

Among modern scholars, Sappho's sexuality is still debated – André Lardinois has described it as the "Great Sappho Question". Early translators of Sappho sometimes heterosexualised her poetry. Ambrose Philips' 1711 translation of the Ode to Aphrodite portrayed the object of Sappho's desire as male, a reading that was followed by virtually every other translator of the poem until the 20th century, while in 1781 Alessandro Verri interpreted fragment 31 as being about Sappho's love for Phaon. Friedrich Gottlieb Welcker argued that Sappho's feelings for other women were "entirely idealistic and non-sensual", while Karl Otfried Müller wrote that fragment 31 described "nothing but a friendly affection": Glenn Most comments that "one wonders what language Sappho would have used to describe her feelings if they had been ones of sexual excitement", if this theory were correct. By 1970, it would be argued that the same poem contained "proof positive of [Sappho's] lesbianism".

Today, it is generally accepted that Sappho's poetry portrays homoerotic feelings: as Sandra Boehringer puts it, her works "clearly celebrate eros between women". Toward the end of the 20th century, though, some scholars began to reject the question of whether or not Sappho was a lesbian – Glenn Most wrote that Sappho herself "would have had no idea what people mean when they call her nowadays a homosexual", André Lardinois stated that it is "nonsensical" to ask whether Sappho was a lesbian, and Page DuBois calls the question a "particularly obfuscating debate".

One of the major focuses of scholars studying Sappho has been to attempt to determine the cultural context in which Sappho's poems were composed and performed. Various cultural contexts and social roles played by Sappho have been suggested, including teacher, cult-leader, and poet performing for a circle of female friends. However, the performance contexts of many of Sappho's fragments are not easy to determine, and for many more than one possible context is conceivable.

One longstanding suggestion of a social role for Sappho is that of "Sappho as schoolmistress". At the beginning of the 20th century, the German classicist Ulrich von Wilamowitz-Moellendorff posited that Sappho was a sort of schoolteacher, to "explain away Sappho's passion for her 'girls and defend her from accusations of homosexuality. The view continues to be influential, both among scholars and the general public, though more recently the idea has been criticised by historians as anachronistic and has been rejected by several prominent classicists as unjustified by the evidence. In 1959, Denys Page, for example, stated that Sappho's extant fragments portray "the loves and jealousies, the pleasures and pains, of Sappho and her companions"; and he adds, "We have found, and shall find, no trace of any formal or official or professional relationship between them... no trace of Sappho the principal of an academy." David A. Campbell in 1967 judged that Sappho may have "presided over a literary coterie", but that "evidence for a formal appointment as priestess or teacher is hard to find". None of Sappho's own poetry mentions her teaching, and the earliest source to support the idea of Sappho as a teacher comes from Ovid, six centuries after Sappho's lifetime. Despite these problems, many newer interpretations of Sappho's social role are still based on this idea. In these interpretations, Sappho was involved in the ritual education of girls, for instance as a trainer of choruses of girls.

Even if Sappho did compose songs for training choruses of young girls, not all of her poems can be interpreted in this light, and despite scholars' best attempts to find one, Yatromanolakis argues that there is no single performance context to which all of Sappho's poems can be attributed. Parker argues that Sappho should be considered as part of a group of female friends for whom she would have performed, just as her contemporary Alcaeus is. Some of her poetry appears to have been composed for identifiable formal occasions, but many of her songs are about – and possibly were to be performed at – banquets.

Legacy

Ancient reputation

In antiquity, Sappho's poetry was highly admired, and several ancient sources refer to her as the "tenth Muse". The earliest surviving poem to do so is a third-century BC epigram by Dioscorides, but poems are preserved in the Greek Anthology by Antipater of Sidon and attributed to Plato on the same theme. She was sometimes referred to as "The Poetess", just as Homer was "The Poet". The scholars of Alexandria included her in the canon of nine lyric poets. According to Aelian, the Athenian lawmaker and poet Solon asked to be taught a song by Sappho "so that I may learn it and then die". This story may well be apocryphal, especially as Ammianus Marcellinus tells a similar story about Socrates and a song of Stesichorus, but it is indicative of how highly Sappho's poetry was considered in the ancient world.

Sappho's poetry also influenced other ancient authors. In Greek, the Hellenistic poet Nossis was described by Marilyn B. Skinner as an imitator of Sappho, and Kathryn Gutzwiller argues that Nossis explicitly positioned herself as an inheritor of Sappho's position as a woman poet. Beyond poetry, Plato cites Sappho in his Phaedrus, and Socrates' second speech on love in that dialogue appears to echo Sappho's descriptions of the physical effects of desire in fragment 31. In the first century BC, Catullus established the themes and metres of Sappho's poetry as a part of Latin literature, adopting the Sapphic stanza, believed in antiquity to have been invented by Sappho, giving his lover in his poetry the name "Lesbia" in reference to Sappho, and adapting and translating Sappho's 31st fragment in his poem 51.

Other ancient poets wrote about Sappho's life. She was a popular character in ancient Athenian comedy, and at least six separate comedies called Sappho are known. The earliest known ancient comedy to take Sappho as its main subject was the early-fifth or late-fourth century BC Sappho by Ameipsias, though nothing is known of it apart from its name. As these comedies survive only in fragments, it is uncertain exactly how they portrayed Sappho, but she was likely characterised as a promiscuous woman. In Diphilos' play, she was the lover of the poets Anacreon and Hipponax. Sappho was also a favourite subject in the visual arts.  She was the most commonly depicted poet on sixth and fifth-century Attic red-figure vase paintings – though unlike male poets such as Anacreon and Alcaeus, in the four surviving vases in which she is identified by an inscription she is never shown singing. She was also shown on coins from Mytilene and Lesbos from the first to third centuries AD, and reportedly depicted in a sculpture by Silanion at Syracuse, statues in Pergamon and Constantinople, and a painting by the Hellenistic artist Leon. 

From the fourth century BC, ancient works portray Sappho as a tragic heroine, driven to suicide by her unrequited love for Phaon. A fragment of a play by Menander says that Sappho threw herself off of the cliff at Leucas out of her love for him. Ovid's Heroides 15 is written as a letter from Sappho to Phaon, and when it was first rediscovered in the 15th century was thought to be a translation of an authentic letter of Sappho's. Sappho's suicide was also depicted in classical art, for instance on a first-century BC basilica in Rome near the Porta Maggiore.

While Sappho's poetry was admired in the ancient world, her character was not always so well considered. In the Roman period, critics found her lustful and perhaps even homosexual. Horace called her "mascula Sappho" in his Epistles, which the later Porphyrio commented was "either because she is famous for her poetry, in which men more often excel, or because she is maligned for having been a tribad". By the third century AD, the difference between Sappho's literary reputation as a poet and her moral reputation as a woman had become so significant that the suggestion that there were in fact two Sapphos began to develop. In his Historical Miscellanies, Aelian wrote that there was "another Sappho, a courtesan, not a poetess".

Modern reception

By the medieval period, Sappho's works had been lost, though she was still quoted in later authors. Her work became more accessible in the 16th century through printed editions of those authors who had quoted her. In 1508 Aldus Manutius printed an edition of Dionysius of Halicarnassus, which contained Sappho 1, the "Ode to Aphrodite", and the first printed edition of Longinus' On the Sublime, complete with his quotation of Sappho 31, appeared in 1554. In 1566, the French printer Robert Estienne produced an edition of the Greek lyric poets that contained around 40 fragments attributed to Sappho.

In 1652, the first English translation of a poem by Sappho was published, in John Hall's translation of On the Sublime. In 1681 Anne Le Fèvre's French edition of Sappho made her work even more widely known. Theodor Bergk's 1854 edition became the standard edition of Sappho in the second half of the 19th century; in the first part of the 20th century, the papyrus discoveries of new poems by Sappho led to editions and translations by Edwin Marion Cox and John Maxwell Edmonds, and culminated in the 1955 publication of Edgar Lobel's and Denys Page's Poetarum Lesbiorum Fragmenta.

Like the ancients, modern critics have tended to consider Sappho's poetry "extraordinary". As early as the ninth century, Sappho was referred to as a talented woman poet, and in works such as Boccaccio's De Claris Mulieribus and Christine de Pisan's Book of the City of Ladies she gained a reputation as a learned lady. Even after Sappho's works had been lost, the Sapphic stanza continued to be used in medieval lyric poetry, and with the rediscovery of her work in the Renaissance, she began to increasingly influence European poetry. In the 16th century, members of La Pléiade, a circle of French poets, were influenced by her to experiment with Sapphic stanzas and with writing love-poetry with a first-person female voice.  Early modern and modern composers have also been inspired by Sappho; notable compositions based on her life or works include operas such as Sappho (1794) by Jean-Paul-Égide Martini, Sappho (1897) by Jules Massenet, Sappho (1963) by Peggy Glanville-Hicks; the percussion piece Psappha (1975) and orchestral work Aïs (1980) by Iannis Xenakis; and the composition Charaxos, Eos and Tithonos (2014) by Theodore Antoniou.

From the Romantic era, Sappho's work – especially her "Ode to Aphrodite" – has been a key influence of conceptions of what lyric poetry should be. Such influential poets as Alfred Lord Tennyson in the 19th century, and A. E. Housman in the 20th century, have been influenced by her poetry. Tennyson based poems including "Eleanore" and "Fatima" on Sappho's fragment 31, while three of Housman's works are adaptations of the Midnight poem, long thought to be by Sappho though the authorship is now disputed. At the beginning of the 20th century, the Imagists – especially Ezra Pound, H. D., and Richard Aldington – were influenced by Sappho's fragments; a number of Pound's poems in his early collection Lustra were adaptations of Sapphic poems, while H. D.'s poetry was frequently Sapphic in "style, theme or content", and in some cases, such as "Fragment 40" more specifically invoke Sappho's writing.

It was not long after the rediscovery of Sappho that her sexuality once again became the focus of critical attention. In the early 17th century, John Donne wrote "Sapho to Philaenis", returning to the idea of Sappho as a hypersexual lover of women. The modern debate on Sappho's sexuality began in the 19th century, with Welcker publishing, in 1816, an article defending Sappho from charges of prostitution and lesbianism, arguing that she was chaste – a position that would later be taken up by Wilamowitz at the end of the 19th and Henry Thornton Wharton at the beginning of the 20th centuries. In the 19th century Sappho was co-opted by the Decadent Movement as a lesbian "daughter of de Sade", by Charles Baudelaire in France and later Algernon Charles Swinburne in England. By the late 19th century, lesbian writers such as Michael Field and Amy Levy became interested in Sappho for her sexuality, and by the turn of the 20th century she was a sort of "patron saint of lesbians".

From the beginning of the 19th century, women poets such as Felicia Hemans (The Last Song of Sappho) and Letitia Elizabeth Landon (Sketch the First. Sappho, and in Ideal Likenesses) took Sappho as one of their progenitors. Sappho also began to be regarded as a role model for campaigners for women's rights, beginning with works such as Caroline Norton's The Picture of Sappho. Later in that century, she would become a model for the so-called New Woman – independent and educated women who desired social and sexual autonomy – and by the 1960s, the feminist Sappho was – along with the hypersexual, often but not exclusively lesbian Sappho – one of the two most important cultural perceptions of Sappho. 

The discoveries of new poems by Sappho in 2004 and 2014 excited both scholarly and media attention. The announcement of the Tithonus poem was the subject of international news coverage, and was described by Marilyn Skinner as "the trouvaille of a lifetime".

See also
 Ancient Greek literature
 Papyrus Oxyrhynchus 7 – papyrus preserving Sappho fr. 5
 Papyrus Oxyrhynchus 1231 – papyrus preserving Sappho fr. 15–30
 Lesbian poetry

Notes

References

Works cited

Further reading

External links

 The Digital Sappho
 Commentaries on Sappho's fragments, William Annis.
 Fragments of Sappho, translated by Gregory Nagy and Julia Dubnoff
 Sappho, BBC Radio 4, In Our Time.
 Sappho, BBC Radio 4, Great Lives.
 
 
 Ancient Greek literature recitations, hosted by the Society for the Oral Reading of Greek and Latin Literature. Including a recording of Sappho 1 by Stephen Daitz.

 
6th-century BC Greek people
6th-century BC Greek women
6th-century BC poets
6th-century BC women writers
7th-century BC births
7th-century BC Greek people
7th-century BC Greek women
7th-century BC poets
7th-century BC women poets
Aeolic Greek poets
Ancient Eresians
Ancient Greek erotic poets
Ancient Greek women poets
Ancient LGBT people
Ancient Mytileneans
Greek women composers
Nine Lyric Poets
Poets from ancient Lesbos